Scooby-Doo, Where Are You! is an American animated comedy television series created by Joe Ruby and Ken Spears and produced by Hanna-Barbera for CBS. The series premiered as part of the network's Saturday morning cartoon schedule on September 13, 1969, and aired for two seasons until October 31, 1970. In 1978, a selection of episodes from the later series Scooby's All-Star Laff-A-Lympics and The Scooby-Doo Show were aired on ABC under the Scooby-Doo, Where Are You! name, and they were released in a DVD set marketed as its third season. It also aired on BBC One in the UK from 1970 to 1973. The complete series is also available on the Boomerang, HBO Max, and Tubi streaming services.

Scooby-Doo, Where Are You! is the first incarnation of a long-running media franchise primarily consisting of animated series, several films, and related merchandise.

Overview 
The show focuses on four teenagers Fred, Daphne, Velma, and Shaggy, and their talking dog, Scooby-Doo, who travel in their van, The Mystery Machine, encountering and solving mysteries. Once solved, the group typically discovers that the perpetrator of the mystery is a disguised person who seeks to exploit a local legend or myth for personal gain.

Episodes

Voice cast 

 Don Messick as Scooby-Doo
 Casey Kasem as Shaggy Rogers
 Frank Welker as Fred Jones
 Stefanianna Christopherson as Daphne Blake (season 1)
 Heather North as Daphne Blake  (seasons 2 and 3)
 Nicole Jaffe as Velma Dinkley (seasons 1 and 2)
 Pat Stevens as Velma Dinkley (season 3)

Production

Origin 

Scooby-Doo, Where Are You! was the result of CBS and Hanna-Barbera's plans to create a non-violent Saturday morning program that would appease the parent watch groups that had protested the superhero-based programs of the mid-1960s. Originally titled Mysteries Five and later Who's Scared?, Scooby-Doo, Where Are You! underwent a number of changes from script to screen (the most significant being the downplaying of a musical group angle). However, the basic concept—a group of teenagers and their dog solving supernatural-related mysteries—was always in place.

Writing 
Scooby-Doo creators Joe Ruby and Ken Spears served as the story supervisors on the series. Ruby, Spears, and Bill Lutz wrote all of the scripts for the 17 first-season episodes, while Lutz, Larz Bourne, and Tom Dagenais wrote the eight second-season episodes with Ruby and Spears as story editors. The plot varied little from episode to episode. The main concept was as follows:

 The gang is driving in the Mystery Machine, either returning from or going to a regular teenage function, when their van breaks down for any of a variety of reasons (overheating, flat tire, out of gas) in the immediate vicinity of a large mostly vacated property (ski lodge, hotel, factory, mansion).
 Their unintended destination turns out to be suffering from a monster problem (ghosts, yetis, vampires, witches, etc). The gang then volunteers to investigate the case.
 The gang splits up to cover more ground, with Fred and Velma finding clues, Daphne finding danger, and Shaggy and Scooby finding food, fun and the ghost/monster, who chases them.
 Eventually, enough clues are found to convince the gang that the ghost/monster is a fake. Fred then develops a much too complex trap to capture it (only for it to invariably go awry). Alternatively, the gang calls the local sheriff, only to get stopped by the villain half-way.
 Eventually, the ghost/monster is apprehended and discovered to be disguised. Once unmasked, the ghost/monster turns out to be an unsuspected authority figure or otherwise innocuous local who is using the disguise to cover up something, such as a crime or a scam.
 After giving the parting shot of "And I'd have gotten away with it too, if it weren't for those meddling kids", the offender is then taken away to jail and the gang is allowed to continue on the way to their destination.

Music 
The second season featured bubblegum "chase scene" songs produced by La La Productions (which had originally been contracted to create the music for Josie and the Pussycats, the first of many animated series made from the same mold as Scooby-Doo, Where Are You!). These songs were written by Danny Janssen and Austin Roberts, and were performed by Roberts, who also made a new recording of the Scooby-Doo, Where Are You! theme song for the second season. The series' theme song has been covered by several subsequent artists, including Matthew Sweet for the 1995 TV special and album Saturday Morning: Cartoons' Greatest Hits; Third Eye Blind for the 1998 film Scooby-Doo on Zombie Island and Scooby-Doo! and the Monster of Mexico; Billy Ray Cyrus for Scooby-Doo! and the Witch's Ghost (1999); Jennifer Love Hewitt for Scooby-Doo and the Alien Invaders (2000); the B-52's (Cindy, Kate and Fred) for Scooby-Doo and the Cyber Chase (2001); MxPx for the live-action Scooby-Doo film (2002); Krystal Harris for Scooby-Doo! and the Legend of the Vampire (2003); and Best Coast for Scoob! (2020).

Scooby-Doo, Where Are You! utilized a laugh track, a common feature in most animated TV series until the late 1970s. It was removed for syndication in the 1980s. Following Turner's purchase of Hanna-Barbera and its networks' (TBS, TNT and Cartoon Network) initial broadcast of the series in 1994, the laugh track was reinstated in 1997.

Home media 
On June 4, 2002, Warner Home Video released four episodes from the series on a compilation DVD in Region 1 entitled Scooby-Doo's Creepiest Capers. They later released all 25 episodes on DVD in Region 1 on March 16, 2004 under the title Scooby-Doo, Where Are You! The Complete First and Second Seasons. A DVD entitled Scooby-Doo, Where Are You! The Complete Third Season was released on April 10, 2007, made up of episodes produced in 1978, added to the Scooby's All-Stars package, and later syndicated as part of The Scooby-Doo Show.

On November 9, 2010, Warner Home Video released Scooby-Doo, Where Are You!: The Complete Series. The eight-disc set features all 25 episodes of the series plus the 16 episodes produced in 1978 which aired as part of Scooby's All-Stars. The set is encased in special collectible packaging in the form of a Mystery Machine replica. It also features a special bonus disc filled with new and archival material.  The set was re-released on November 13, 2012. A Blu-ray version of the Complete Series was released on September 3, 2019, for the series' 50th anniversary.

Starting on January 27, 2009, Warner Home Video released single-disc DVDs with four episodes each, plus an episode from Shaggy and Scooby-Doo Get a Clue. Four volumes have been released through October 19, 2010.

Reception 
Scooby-Doo, Where Are You! was a hit for Hanna-Barbera and CBS, which led Hanna-Barbera to eventually create series with similar concepts on ABC, NBC, and CBS, including, Josie and the Pussycats, The Pebbles and Bamm-Bamm Show, The Pebbles, Dino and Bamm-Bamm segments on The Flintstone Comedy Show, The Funky Phantom, Speed Buggy, Jeannie, Jabberjaw, The Amazing Chan and the Chan Clan, Inch High Private Eye, Goober and the Ghost Chasers, Clue Club, Captain Caveman and the Teen Angels, Butch Cassidy and the Sundance Kids, and The New Shmoo.

In 2005, Scooby-Doo, Where Are You! came 49th in Channel 4's 100 Greatest Cartoons, in the UK, and was more recently voted the 8th greatest Kids' TV Show by viewers of the same channel. It was ranked the 24th greatest cartoon on IGN's Top 100 Animated Series.

See also 
 List of works produced by Hanna-Barbera Productions
 Lost Mysteries

References

External links 

 Official Scooby-Doo website
 
 
 Cartoon Network: Dept. of Cartoons: Scooby-Doo, Where Are You!—cached copy from Internet Archive
 "Hanna-Barbera Studios" (and sub-articles), The Big Cartoon DataBase

1960s American animated television series
1969 American television series debuts
1970s American animated television series
1978 American television series endings
1960s American mystery television series
1970s American mystery television series
1960s American horror comedy television series
1970s American horror comedy television series
Yeti in fiction
CBS original programming
American Broadcasting Company original programming
English-language television shows
Scooby-Doo television series
Television series by Hanna-Barbera
Television series by Warner Bros. Television Studios
American children's animated adventure television series
American children's animated comedy television series
American children's animated fantasy television series
American children's animated horror television series
American children's animated mystery television series
Animated television series about dogs
Teen animated television series
Television series created by Joe Ruby
Television series created by Ken Spears